This was the first edition of the tournament.

Marcelo Arévalo and Jean-Julien Rojer won the title, defeating Lloyd Glasspool and Harri Heliövaara in the final, 7–6(7–4), 6–4.

Seeds

Draw

Draw

References

External links
 Main draw

Dallas Open - Doubles
Dallas Open (2022)